The Virginia–Virginia Tech rivalry is an American college rivalry that exists between the Virginia Cavaliers sports teams of the University of Virginia (called Virginia in sports media and abbreviated UVA) and the Virginia Tech Hokies sports teams of Virginia Polytechnic Institute and State University (called Virginia Tech and abbreviated VT). The Cavaliers and Hokies had a program-wide rivalry first called the Commonwealth Challenge (2005–2007) which UVA swept 2–0 before ending the series in a show of sportsmanship following the Virginia Tech massacre. A second series called the Commonwealth Clash (2014–2019), under revised rules and sponsored by the state's Virginia 529 College Savings Plan, was again won by UVA, 3–2. A third series, also called the Clash (2021–Present) and sponsored by Smithfield Foods, emerged three years after the previous series was concluded and is currently led by VT, 1–0. The Cavaliers lead the rivalry series in the majority of sports.

Both athletics programs are members of the Atlantic Coast Conference. In sports that have divisional play, such as college baseball and college football, they both compete in the Coastal division of the conference. Despite different or no conference affiliations from 1937 to 2004, Virginia and Virginia Tech always maintained athletic ties and were annual rivals in a great many sports.

All-time and ACC series results

Series led and games won by Virginia are shaded ██. Series led and games won by Virginia Tech shaded ██.
Head-to-head games/matches only

Conference, Sponsorship, Relative Popularity and Success

UVA has been a member of the ACC since 1953, while Virginia Tech was invited in 2004. Both athletics programs are also sponsored by Nike. The Cavaliers are signed with Nike through 2025, at $3.5 million per year. The Hokies are also signed with Nike through 2022, at $1.98 million per year. Virginia had the third-highest ACC total athletics revenue, with $91 million, in 2014–2015. Virginia Tech was sixth out of the 15 programs, drawing $80 million.

UVA polled as the most popular college sports program in their home state as of 2015 — with Virginians choosing the Cavaliers over the Hokies by a six-point margin of 34% to 28% — despite UVA having fewer students and a smaller alumni base than Virginia Tech. The first and only Fan Vote of the Commonwealth Clash, also in 2015, bore out that result as there were more Cavalier votes than Hokie votes in the final tally which allowed UVA to take the point. The overall Virginia Cavaliers program polled more popular than all NFL and MLB teams (NBA teams were not polled) while only the former Washington Redskins tied the overall Virginia Tech program at 28% support.

The Cavaliers have twice won the prestigious Capital One Cup for fielding the top overall men's athletics program in the nation, in 2015 and 2019, and UVA places first in the ACC for all-time Men's NCAA Championships with 20. Virginia is also tied for second place in the conference for NCAA Championships in women's sports with 8. UVA's recent NCAA Championships include winning the 2019 NCAA Tournament Championship in men's basketball, winning the 2015 College World Series in baseball, and winning the 2014 College Cup in men's soccer. On the other side of the rivalry, Virginia Tech is one of two ACC programs (the other is Pittsburgh) to have not yet earned its first NCAA Championship in a team sport.

Virginia fields more overall teams than Virginia Tech. As a result, certain highly successful UVA teams like the eight-time NCAA Champion Virginia Cavaliers men's lacrosse team and two-time NCAA Champion Virginia women's rowing team have never competed against Virginia Tech and so do not consider the Hokies their rivals.

Commonwealth Challenge and Clash

Newly in the same conference, the two schools agreed to face off in the Commonwealth Challenge across all sports in 2005. The Challenge continued through 2007, with the Cavaliers winning both years of the competition. Future sponsorship was not sought out of respect for the Virginia Tech massacre. Virginia athletic director Craig Littlepage stated at the time that "now is not the time to be talking about bragging rights."

In August 2014, the two schools announced a renewed rivalry competition with a new name and new scoring system between the two schools, named the Commonwealth Clash. This more recent competition was sponsored by Virginia 529 College Savings Plan. At the end of the 2018–19 academic year, UVA led the Clash series 3–2 and total points 60–47. This was then declared the final year of the original Clash on its official website.

Each meeting or yearly series in a sport is worth a single point in the Clash. In basketball and volleyball, where the two schools meet twice per season, each individual game is worth one-half point. In baseball and softball, the point is awarded to the winner of the series, with a split of a two-game series earning one-half point each. A tied game in soccer also awards one-half point each. In sports where teams participate in meets or tournaments instead of head-to-head – cross country, indoor and outdoor track and field, and men's and women's golf – the school that finishes higher in the ACC championship earns the point. Swimming and diving also fell under this category, even though the two schools schedule an annual meet against each other; this meeting does not count toward the Clash.

There are 22 points, requiring 11½ to clinch the Clash. If there is a tie, the first tiebreaker is the greater number of ACC championships in common sports, followed by the greater number of honor roll athletes in common sports. The tiebreakers were invoked for the only time in 2016–17; Virginia Tech won the tiebreaker in that Clash by capturing four ACC championships to Virginia's one.

The 2019–20 Clash trophy was not awarded due to the COVID-19 pandemic. At the time competition was suspended, Virginia led 7–6, with eight points remaining to be contested and nearly all of them in sports which had often favored Virginia in the previous years of the Clash. But by the official website, those results were not finalized and the previous 2018–19 athletics year was the final year of the original Clash.

The Clash made its return after a three-year absence for the 2021–22 academic year, with Smithfield Foods taking over sponsorship duties. After winning the baseball series, 2–1, the Hokies would clinch the Clash for the year, eventually winning, 13–8.

Yearly records

Commonwealth Clash

Intensity and Pranks
Some from outside the state find the rivalry to be an especially bitter one. Former Ohio State quarterback and football analyst Kirk Herbstreit said in 2004 that he "never realized how much those people hate each other." He went on to say "when I was down in Blacksburg, I said some nice things about Al Groh and it was like I had turned my back on them."

In 2011, students from Virginia Tech put a tee shirt from their school on a statue of Thomas Jefferson located on The Lawn, after Virginia Tech's football team won the yearly matchup.

History

Virginia Tech joins ACC
In 2003, the Atlantic Coast Conference initially planned to add Boston College, Miami, and Syracuse to the conference lineup. Talks with Syracuse stalled as Jim Boeheim vocalized his opposition to the move, and Duke, UNC, and Virginia consistently voted against adding the Orange. When it became obvious that Syracuse lacked the necessary seven votes, Virginia Tech emerged as a compromise candidate put forward to win over the decisive seventh vote from the University of Virginia that ACC officials needed to gain approval for their expansion plans.

Virginia Governor Mark Warner earlier had suggested the NCAA intervene and mediate the expansion process, and when that failed added pressure to UVA President John Casteen to refrain from casting an affirmative vote for the conference's plan to expand without Virginia Tech. Warner feared that such a move would hurt Virginia Tech by leaving it in a diminished Big East. UVA President John T. Casteen III then offered a plan to have the ACC expand but consider Virginia Tech in lieu of Syracuse on June 18, 2003. Duke and UNC voted against the Hokies, but with Casteen's support Virginia Tech was invited to the conference with 7 out of 9 votes. Miami and Virginia Tech joined the ACC in 2004, with Boston College joining in 2005.

The primary significance of this development to the rivalry was that the athletic teams from the two schools would now be mandated to play every year. For instance, the men's college soccer teams did not face each other in any of the four seasons between 2000 and 2003. They have since met every year after Virginia Tech became a conference member in 2004. Additionally, in some sports where there was already an agreement to play each other on an annual basis, the teams might now play more than once. For instance, the men's college basketball teams had played each other annually since the 1934–35 season but not faced each other twice in the same season since 1983–84. Starting with the 2004–05 season, the teams have played at least twice each year, and in 2005–06 the teams met for a third time in the ACC Tournament.

Impact of the Virginia Tech massacre
In addition to ending the original Commonwealth Challenge, the Virginia Tech massacre had the effect of lessening of hostilities between the two universities during the aftermath. According to The Washington Post "students in both camps are more apt to think of themselves as simply Virginians." UVa students were among the first to lend support to the Virginia Tech community in the wake of the shootings. Likewise, the connections between the two university's populations are often very close. Prior to the 2007 football contest in Charlottesville both college's bands participated in a joint performance.

UVa.'s student newspaper reported that students in Charlottesville were even sporting Hokie sweatshirts on occasion in observance of the tragedy. The University's Z Society went so far as unveiling a 65' x 120' Virginia Pride flag featuring both UVA and VT logos on it during the annual football game, and it was noted that the two fan bases had never been so close as they were after the shootings.

See also
 Virginia–Virginia Tech football rivalry
 Virginia–Virginia Tech men's basketball rivalry

References

College sports rivalries in the United States
College sports in Virginia
Virginia Cavaliers
Virginia Tech Hokies
Sports rivalries in Virginia